Whitehouse is a hamlet in Aberdeenshire, Scotland.

The hamlet was formerly served by a railway station on the Alford Valley Railway.

Today, some 220 buses call here and continue to either Alford or Aberdeen via Kemnay, and some 421 buses call here and continue to either Alford or Inverurie via Kemnay.

References 

Villages in Aberdeenshire